Platon Sergeevich Poretsky (October 3, 1846 in Elisavetgrad, Russian Empire – August 9, 1907 in Gorodnyansky Uyezd, Chernigov Governorate, Russian Empire) was a noted Russian Imperial astronomer, mathematician, and logician.

Graduated from Kharkov University, he worked in Astrakhan and Pulkovo in St. Petersburg.

Later, as an astronomer at Kazan University, following the advice of his older colleague Professor of Mathematics A.V. Vasiliev at Kazan University (father of Nicolai A. Vasiliev) to learn the works of George Boole, Poretsky developed "logical calculus" and through specific "logical equations" applied it to the theory of probability. Thus, he extended and augmented the works of logicians and mathematicians George Boole, William Stanley Jevons and Ernst Schröder. He discovered Poretsky's law of forms and gave the first general treatment of antecedent and consequent Boolean reasoning, laying the groundwork for Archie Blake's work on the Blake canonical form.

Notes

References
     Styazhkin, N.I. History of Mathematical Logic from Leibniz to Peano. Cambridge, Mass./ London, MIT Press, 1969.
     Bazhanov, V.A. New Archival Materials, Concerning P.S. Poretsky. In: Modern Logic, 1992, vol. 3. N 1. pp. 80–81.
     Bazhanov, V.A.  Life and Academic Work of Mathematical Logic Research Pioneer in Russia P.S. Poretsky. In: Voprosy Istorii Estestvoznania i Tekhniki, 2005, N 4. pp. 64–73 (in Russian).
     Bazhanov, V.A. History of Logic in Russia and the USSR. Moscow, Kanon+, 2007 (in Russian).

External links
Platon Poretsky at the MacTutor History of Mathematics archive
 S.L. Katrechko, Platon Sergeevich Poretskij

Astronomers from the Russian Empire
19th-century mathematicians from the Russian Empire
Academic staff of Kazan Federal University
Scientists from Kropyvnytskyi
National University of Kharkiv alumni
Russian people of Ukrainian descent
1846 births
1907 deaths
Scientists from the Russian Empire